S. N. Sriramadesikan (21 June 1921 – 17 March 2014) was an Indian scholar of Sanskrit and Tamil, lecturer, principal, editor and publisher. Among his many works, he is best known for translating the Tirukkural into both Sanskrit and English.

Biography 
S. N. Sriramadesikan had a long scholarly career in the fields of language, literature and translation in Sanskrit, Tamil and English. He was appointed by the then Chief Minister of Tamil Nadu M. G. Ramachandran as special officer in the State Government Department of Indian Medicine and Homoeopathy for about 13 years, during which time he worked on his comprehensive and well-researched translation of ancient Ayurveda Sanskrit texts into Tamil. These include translations of 25,000 verses of Ashtanga Sangraham and Charaka Susruta Samhitas running into six volumes of 6,400 pages, which have been prescribed as college textbooks for students of Ayurveda in the country.

When he requested the then President Rajendra Prasad for support to Sanskrit, a Sanskrit Commission was set up, whose recommendations led to the creation of centrally funded and managed Vidya Peetams for Sanskrit learning and research.

During his long career, he served as a research scholar in Sri Venkateswara Oriental Research Institute (1943–1945), as a research officer in Kendriya Sanskrit Vidyapith (1972–1975), as an honorary editor in Saraswati Mahal Library in Thanjavur (1980), and as an honorary adviser for Oriental Manuscript Library, Government of Madras, Chennai (1988).

Sriramadesikan died on 17 March 2014 at the age of 92.

Awards and honors
In recognition of his services to Ayurveda, the Kanchi Kamakoti Peetham conferred on him the title, 'Ayurveda Bharati' and Srirangam Srimad Andavan Ashramam the title of 'Abhinava Sushruta Vishruta'. Further to the initiative of the then Indian President V. V. Giri, Sriramadesikan was awarded the highest honour of President's award for Sanskrit Proficiency in 1971. In 1993, the Government of Tamil Nadu conferred on him the Kalaimamani award.

Literary works
Apart from the classic treatises on Ayurveda, Sriramadesikan has composed in Sanskrit 'Desika Mani Satakam' and 'Krishna Katha Sangraham'. He has also rendered the Tirukkural, Naaladiyar, Pathuppattu, Ettuthogai, Silappadikaram, Avvaiyar's Needi works, and Tiruppavai and the works of Subramaniya Bharati into Sanskrit. He also made the well-annotated translation of Bharata's Natya Shastra from the Sanskrit original of 6,000 verses.

Below is a list of literary works of Sriramadesikan:
 Avvaiyar Niti (Sanskrit translation)
 Susruta Samhita (Tamil translation of Sanskrit Ayurveda text)
 Bharatanatya Sastram—Tracing the History
 Bharatiar Works
 Ettu Thogai (Sanskrit translation)
 Sanga Noolgalil Vaidika Kalacharam (research work)
 Kambaramayanam (Balakandam, Sanskrit translation)
 Naaladiyar (Sanskrit translation with Tamil and English expositions)
 Pathupattu (Sanskrit translation)
 Silappadikaram (Pukar Kandam, Sanskrit )
 Tirukkural (two volumes of Sanskrit translation with Tamil and English expositions)
 Tiruppavai (Sanskrit translation)
 Vemana Padaya (Sanskrit and Tamil translations)

See also

 Tirukkural translations
 Tirukkural translations into English
 List of translators into English

References

Further reading
 Manavalan, A. A. (2010). A Compendium of Tirukkural Translations in English (4 vols.). Chennai: Central Institute of Classical Tamil, .
 Sanskrit Works of SN Srirama Desikan

1921 births
2014 deaths
People from Kanchipuram district
Sanskrit–Tamil translators
Tamil–English translators
Tamil–Sanskrit translators
Tirukkural translators
Translators of the Tirukkural into English
Translators of the Tirukkural into Sanskrit